Budna is a hamlet located in Bedfordshire, England. At the 2011 Census the population of the hamlet was included in the civil parish of Northill.

Budna is located to the north of the village of Northill, and near to Thorncote Green and Hatch. Budna lies on the border between Central Bedfordshire and the Borough of Bedford.

Hamlets in Bedfordshire
Central Bedfordshire District